Fahed Salem (born 10 September 1953) is a Kuwaiti judoka. He competed in the men's half-heavyweight event at the 1976 Summer Olympics.

References

1953 births
Living people
Kuwaiti male judoka
Olympic judoka of Kuwait
Judoka at the 1976 Summer Olympics
Place of birth missing (living people)